Haixiu 121 class tug is a class of naval auxiliary ship currently in service with the People's Liberation Army Navy (PLAN).  The class is named after the first unit commissioned, and only a single unit of this class is known to be in active service.

The designation Haixiu 121 is unique in that it is different from the usual Chinese naming convention for ships in military service. Ordinarily, auxiliary ships in PLAN service are designated by a combination of two or more Chinese characters followed by three-digit number. The first Chinese character denotes which fleet the ship belongs to—East for East Sea Fleet, North for North Sea Fleet, and South for South Sea Fleet. The second indicates the function the ship performs, usually  for tugboats. Haixiu 121 is a tug, but is designated a repair ship ). The pennant numbers may have changed due to a change of Chinese naval ships naming convention.

References

Auxiliary ships of the People's Liberation Army Navy
Auxiliary tugboat classes